The 1966 Connecticut Huskies football team represented the University of Connecticut as a member of the Yankee Conference during the 1966 NCAA College Division football season. Led by first-year head coach John Toner, Huskies compiled an overall record of 2–6–1 with a mark of 2–2–1 in conference play, placing third in the Yankee Conference.<

Schedule

References

Connecticut
UConn Huskies football seasons
Connecticut Huskies football